Matheus Leonardo Sales Cardoso (born 11 February 1998), commonly known as Matheusinho, is a Brazilian footballer who plays for América Mineiro as an attacking midfielder.

Club career
Born in Belo Horizonte, Minas Gerais, Matheusinho joined América Mineiro's youth setup in 2011, aged 13. In 2016, he was promoted to the main squad by manager Givanildo Oliveira.

Matheusinho made his first team debut on 19 March 2016, coming on as a second-half substitute for Tiago Luís in a 0–2 Campeonato Mineiro away loss against Tombense. He appeared in two further matches during the tournament, as his side was crowned champions.

Matheusinho made his Série A debut on 2 June 2016, replacing Alan Mineiro in a 1–2 home loss against Ponte Preta. On 30 September, after already becoming a starter under new manager Enderson Moreira, he renewed his contract until 2021. On 18 September 2020 he was transferred and signed a 5 year contract with Beitar Jerusalem for an undisclosed fee.

Career statistics

Honours
América Mineiro
 Campeonato Mineiro: 2016
 Campeonato Brasileiro Série B: 2017

References

External links

1998 births
Living people
Footballers from Belo Horizonte
Brazilian footballers
América Futebol Clube (MG) players
Beitar Jerusalem F.C. players
F.C. Ashdod players
Campeonato Brasileiro Série A players
Campeonato Brasileiro Série B players
Israeli Premier League players
Expatriate footballers in Israel
Brazilian expatriate sportspeople in Israel
Association football midfielders